Zübeyde Hanım (1856 – 15 January 1923) was the mother of Mustafa Kemal Atatürk, the founder of the Republic of Turkey. She was the only daughter of the Hacısofular family which included her two brothers. Zübeyde was born in Langaza village (now in Thessaloniki regional unit), Ottoman Empire in 1857 as the daughter of a Turkish peasant.
Hacısofular Family migrated to Macedonia after the collapse of Karamanids.

Early life
Zübeyde Hanım's education was basic and only consisted of learning to read and write. Because she could read and write, she was nicknamed Zübeyde Molla (someone knowledgeable and teaches other people, in particular, a teacher of theology) by some people.

Zübeyde Hanım was a devout Muslim and as a result of her pious upbringing she wanted her son Mustafa Kemal Atatürk to go to Mahalle Mektebi, an Islamic school that teaches the Qur'an.

Zübeyde Hanım's first marriage was to Ali Rıza Efendi. With her dark blonde hair, deep blue eyes and fair skin, she won the admiration of Ali Rıza, a border guard. Ali Riza's older sister arranged this marriage - as was the tradition at that time. Zübeyde Hanım was in her early teens and 20 years younger than her husband. Their first child was Fatma, followed by Ömer and Ahmet, but they all died in childhood. In 1881, she gave birth to a son Mustafa, and a daughter, Makbule in 1885.

Zübeyde Hanım, also gave birth to a daughter Naciye in 1889, but she died of tuberculosis in childhood.

Zübeyde and Kemal

She was widowed at a young age, as her husband died when their son Mustafa was six years old.

Following his death, Zübeyde Hanım moved with her two children, Mustafa and Makbule to live with her brother, Hüseyin, who was the manager of a farm outside Salonica.

In her second marriage she was married to Ragıp Bey, who had four children from his previous marriage.
She could not see Mustafa Kemal during the Turkish War of Independence in 1919.

Later life

After the Balkan Wars, when the Ottomans lost Salonica to Greece, she moved to a house in Beşiktaş-Akaretler, Istanbul with her daughter Makbule. She moved to Ankara in 1922, but the climate was not suitable for her, so she was sent to İzmir.

She died on 15 January 1923, and a memorial was built for her in 1940, where she rests now.

Notes

References
 The initial version of this article has been copied (with permission to copy and redistribute with proper attribution) from http://www.turkishdailynews.com.tr/archives.php?id=4000
 The permission is given by Yusuf Kanlı, the editor in chief of Turkish Daily News.

1857 births
1923 deaths
People from Thessaloniki (regional unit)
Mustafa Kemal Atatürk
19th-century people from the Ottoman Empire
Macedonian Turks
Turks from the Ottoman Empire